The South Africa national football team represented South Africa at the FIFA Confederations Cup on two occasions, in 1997 as the champions of 1996 Africa Cup of Nations and 2009 as host of both the tournament and the upcoming 2010 FIFA World Cup.

FIFA Confederations Cup

1997 FIFA Confederations Cup

Group B

2009 FIFA Confederations Cup

Group A

Knockout stage

Semi-finals

Third place play-off

Top goalscorers
Brendan Augustine was the first player to score for South Africa at the FIFA Confederations Cup in 1997.

References

Countries at the FIFA Confederations Cup
South Africa national soccer team